Stemorrhages sericea, the large emerald pearl, is a moth of the subfamily of Spilomelinae within the family Crambidae. It lives throughout Africa south of the Sahara, and the Indian Ocean islands of Réunion, Madagascar, Mauritius and the Comoros.

Adults are pale turquoise with a brown stripe at the front edge of the wings. They have a brush of brown scent disseminating scales, called androconia, on the tail that can be everted for mate attraction.

The larvae feed on species of the Rubiaceae (including Gardenia jasminoides), the Apocynaceae (including Nerium oleander, Tabernanthe iboga, Tabernaemontana persicaefolia and Ervatamia coronaria), and besides on Raphia and Afrocarpus.

References

Moths described in 1773
Taxa named by Dru Drury
Spilomelinae
Lepidoptera of Cameroon
Moths of Madagascar
Moths of Sub-Saharan Africa
Lepidoptera of the Democratic Republic of the Congo
Lepidoptera of Uganda
Moths of the Comoros
Moths of Mauritius
Fauna of the Gambia
Moths of Seychelles
Moths of Réunion